Teralfene is a village in the municipality of Affligem, Belgium. It has an area of 244 ha (602.94 acres). The other communities in Affligem are Hekelgem and Essene.

Name
The name "Teralfene" originates from the brook Alfene (now called the Bellebeek) which flows into the Dender. The oldest reference to the village is Iuxta Alfnam (+- 1142)

History
During the post-Carolingian period, Teralfene belonged to the shire of Brabant. As from 1056 it was part of a German fief that was granted to the counts of Flanders (the so-called Imperial Flanders). During the French period (1796-1815) Teralfene was part of the Dijle-territory. During the Dutch period (1815-1830), this department was transformed to the province South Brabant by Willem I of Orange. Until the end of 1976, Teralfene was an independent municipality.

Politics

List of mayors
This list contains the known mayors of Teralfene until the merger into Affligem.

Political Parties
Before Teralfene became part of Affligem, two political parties were prominent at the local level: the Dries and the Daal-party, each named after an area of the village. Both parties originated from a disagreement over an inheritance, and divided Teralfene since 1850. The Daal and Dries parties had about equal power, and election victories switched constantly for over 100 years.

After the merger into Affligem, other parties (CVP, SP, VU and PVV) gained popularity, and the Daal and Dries parties dissolved.

Demographics

19th Century

20th Century until 1976 (year of merger into Affligem)

See also
 Affligem
 Belgium

Populated places in Flemish Brabant